Megachile demeter is a species of bee in the family Megachilidae. It was described by Theodore Dru Alison Cockerell in 1937.

References

Demeter
Insects described in 1937